Target Optical is an optical company located inside Target stores across the United States.

History 
Target Optical was founded by the Cole National Corp in 1995 in Cleveland, Ohio. In 2004, the Cole National corporation was acquired by the Italian Luxottica S.p.A., this included other Cole National holdings like Pearle Vision. Luxottica folded Cole's operations into its North American Retail Group and the Cole structure was dissolved. Target Optical headquarters is located in the North American Retail Groups headquarters in Mason, Ohio.

References

External links
Official website

Luxottica
Optical
Eyewear retailers of the United States
American companies established in 1995
Retail companies established in 1995
Eyewear companies of the United States
Companies based in Ohio
Companies based in Cincinnati
2004 mergers and acquisitions